Tigran K. Harutyunyan (Armenian: Տիգրան Հարությունյան; born January 15, 1997) is an Armenian chess player. He was awarded the Grandmaster title by FIDE in March 2019.

Chess career 
Harutyunyan earned his FIDE master title in 2012, followed by the international master title in 2014. He earned his third grandmaster norm in March 2019, becoming the 43rd GM from Armenia.

Achievements 
Eight time Armenian Youth champion (at 2006, 2008, 2009, 2010, 2011, 2012, 2013, 2015)
2011: Vice-champion of the World Youth U16 Chess Olympiad  
2012: 4th in European Youth U16 Chess Championships 
2012:4th in World  U16 Chess Championships.  
2013: 5th prize holder of the European Youth U16 Chess Championship 
2014: 5th place in the European Youth U18 Chess Championship  
2014: 6th place in the World Youth U18 Chess Championships  
2014: Bronze medalist of Karen Asrian Memorial International Chess Tournament  
2014: Winner of the World's Youth Stars International Chess Tournament    
2015: Winner of the Nona Gaprindashvili Cup  
2016: Winner of the Georgian Club Championship   
2017: Winner of the ALAIN Juniors Championship  
2018: Vice-champion of the 40 R.G.Nezhmetdinov Memorial  
2019: Vice-champion of the Aeroflot open B  
2019: Winner of the 10eme LUC Open - Tournoi International d'echecs de Lille. 
2019: Third place in  XLII Open Int Escacs Barbera del Valles 2019 Grup A. 
2019: Vice-champion of the XXI Obert Internacional Sant Marti 2019 Grup A  
2019: Winner of the Nona Gaprindashvili Cup (Open A) 2019  
2019: Vice-champion of the in Almaty Open 2019 A   
2019: Winner of the European Universities Chess Championship   
2020: Third place in XXXI International Chess Open Roquetas de Mar   
2020: Winner of the Aeroflot Open 2020 B

References

External links

Living people
Chess grandmasters
1997 births
Armenian chess players